Miriam Olusanya is the Managing Director of Guaranty Trust Bank, the first woman to ever hold the position. She assumed this position in July 2021.
She is a graduate of Pharmacy from the University of Ibadan and a Master of Business Administration from the University of Liverpool.



Education
Miriam Olusanya is a graduate of Pharmacy from the University of Ibadan. She holds a Master of Business Administration degree from the University of Liverpool.

Career
Miriam joined GTB as an executive trainee in 1998. Until her appointment as Managing director, she was an executive director at the bank. She is the first female managing director of the bank.

References

Living people
University of Ibadan alumni
Nigerian women business executives
Year of birth missing (living people)
Alumni of the University of Liverpool